Vladislav Andreyevich Vasilyev (born 10 April 1997) is a Kazakhstani professional footballer who plays for Tobol.

References

External links 
 
 

1997 births
Living people
Kazakhstani footballers
Kazakhstan youth international footballers
Kazakhstan international footballers
Kazakhstani expatriate footballers
Expatriate footballers in Belarus
Expatriate footballers in Uzbekistan
Association football forwards
FC Shakhter Karagandy players
FC Energetik-BGU Minsk players
FC Dynamo Brest players
FC Rukh Brest players
FK Andijon players
FC Tobol players